Pusan National University (PNU), also called Busan National University, is one of ten Flagship Korean National Universities in South Korea and second highest public universities in South Korea.
Located mainly in Busan.

There are fours campuses of the university: Busan Campus, Ami Campus, Miryang Campus and Yangsan Campus. They are located in Busan and South Gyeongsang Province.

Notable alumni and students 
 Aram Hur, educator
 Cho Kyoung-Tae, politician
 Heo Sung-tae, actor
 Im Si-wan, actor and singer (ZE:A)
 Kiggen, singer (Phantom)
 Lee Jae-yong, actor
 Kang Hyung-ho, singer (Forestella)

See also
Flagship Korean National Universities
List of national universities in South Korea
List of universities and colleges in South Korea
Education in Korea

References

External links
 Pusan National University
 Pusan National University(English)

Pusan National University
Educational institutions established in 1946
National universities and colleges in South Korea
1946 establishments in Korea